The 1912 Republican National Convention was held at the Chicago Coliseum, Chicago, Illinois, from June 18 to June 22, 1912. The party nominated President William H. Taft and Vice President James S. Sherman for re-election for the 1912 United States presidential election.

Sherman died days before the election, and was replaced as Republican vice-presidential nominee by Nicholas M. Butler of New York. The ticket went on to place 3rd in the November election behind former president Theodore Roosevelt, who ran under the banner of the new Progressive or "Bull Moose" Party, and Democratic Governor Woodrow Wilson.

Background
This convention marked the climax of a split in the party, resulting from a power struggle between incumbent Taft and former president Theodore Roosevelt that started in 1910. Politically liberal states for the first time were holding Republican primaries. Though Roosevelt had endorsed Taft as his successor, Taft's drift to the right had alienated Roosevelt, who launched a challenge to Taft's re-nomination. Roosevelt overwhelmingly won the primaries — winning 9 out of 13 states. Both Taft and Roosevelt lost their home states to each other. Senator Robert M. La Follette, a reformer, won two states, including his home state of Wisconsin. Through the primaries, Senator La Follette won a total of 36 delegates; President Taft won 48 delegates; and Roosevelt won 278 delegates.  However 36 more conservative states did not hold primaries, but instead selected delegates via state conventions. For years Roosevelt had tried to attract Southern white Democrats to the Republican Party, and he tried to win delegates there in 1912. However Taft had the support of black Republicans in the South, and defeated Roosevelt there.

Convention

Entering the convention, the Roosevelt and Taft forces seemed evenly matched, and a compromise candidate seemed possible. Taft was willing to compromise with Missouri Governor Herbert S. Hadley as presidential nominee; Roosevelt said no.

The Taft and Roosevelt camps engaged in a fight for the delegations of various states, with Taft emerging victorious, and Roosevelt claiming that several delegations were fraudulently seated because of the machinations of conservative party leaders including William Barnes Jr. and Boies Penrose. Roosevelt then accused Taft of steamroller tactics and ordered his supporters to take no further part in the convention. Following the seating of the anti-Roosevelt delegations, California Governor Hiram Johnson proclaimed that progressives would form a new party to nominate Roosevelt. Roosevelt ultimately ran a third party campaign as part of the Progressive Party (nicknamed the "Bull Moose Party"). Taft and Roosevelt both lost the 1912 election to the Democratic nominee, Woodrow Wilson.

Presidential nomination

Presidential candidates 

Though many of Roosevelt's delegates remained at the convention, most refused to take part in the presidential ballot in protest of the contested delegates. Additionally, Roosevelt's name was not placed in nomination. Thus, Taft was re-nominated handily on the first ballot.

Presidential Balloting / 5th Day of Convention (June 22, 1912)

The balloting by states was as follows:

Vice Presidential nomination

Vice Presidential candidates 

Like Taft, Vice President James S. Sherman of New York was renominated by the party. Though Taft and Sherman did not get along early in their tenure, the two became closer allies as Taft's split with Roosevelt deepened, and Taft did not object to the re-nomination of Sherman. Taft's allies sought progressive leaders such as Idaho Senator William E. Borah or Vermont Governor John A. Mead to join the ticket, but both declined to be considered. Missouri Governor Herbert S. Hadley and former Vice President Charles Fairbanks were also mentioned as possibilities. Sherman died shortly before the election, and was not replaced on the ticket. In January, after the election had already been decided, Republican leaders appointed Columbia University president Nicholas Butler to fill out the ticket for the purposes of receiving electoral votes.

Vice Presidential Balloting / 5th Day of Convention (June 22, 1912)

See also
History of the United States Republican Party
List of Republican National Conventions
United States presidential nominating convention
1912 Republican Party presidential primaries
1912 United States presidential election
1912 Democratic National Convention
 1912 Progressive National Convention

References

Further reading
 Broderick, Francis L. Progressivism at risk: Electing a president in 1912 (Praeger, 1989).
 
 Delahaye, Claire. "The New Nationalism and Progressive Issues: The Break with Taft and the 1912 Campaign," in Serge Ricard, ed., A Companion to Theodore Roosevelt (2011) pp 452–67. online
 Felt, Thomas E. "Organizing A National Convention: A Lesson From Senator Dick." Ohio Historical Quarterly (1958) 87#1 pp 50–62.
 Gable, John A. The Bullmoose Years: Theodore Roosevelt and the Progressive Party. Port Washington, NY: Kennikat Press, 1978.
 Gould, Lewis L. Four hats in the ring: The 1912 election and the birth of modern American politics (Univ Pr of Kansas, 2008).
 Gould, Lewis L. "Theodore Roosevelt, William Howard Taft, and the Disputed Delegates in 1912: Texas as a Test Case." Southwestern Historical Quarterly 80.1 (1976): 33-56 online.
 Pinchot, Amos. History of the Progressive Party, 1912–1916. Introduction by Helene Maxwell Hooker. (New York University Press, 1958).
 Selmi, Patrick. "Jane Addams and the Progressive Party Campaign for President in 1912." Journal of Progressive Human Services 22.2 (2011): 160–190.

Primary sources
 Bryan, William Jennings. A Tale of Two Conventions: Being an Account of the Republican and Democratic National Conventions of June, 1912, with an Outline of the Progressive National Convention of August in the Same Year. Funk & Wagnalls Company, 1912. online
 Roosevelt, Theodore. Theodore Roosevelt's Confession of Faith Before the Progressive National Convention, August 6, 1912 (Progressive Party, 1912) online.

External links
"1912 Republican National Convention", The Political Graveyard.  Accessed February 1, 2006
"1912 Republican Convention", 1912 Presidential Election Project, Department of History, Ohio State University.  Accessed February 1, 2006
"1912: A Party Splits", Parades, Protests & Politics in Chicago.  Accessed February 1, 2006
"Bull Moose years: Who Won the Presidential Primaries in 1912?".

External links
 Republican Party platform of 1912 at The American Presidency Project
1912 Republican National Convention at Smithsonian Magazine

1912 United States presidential election
Political conventions in Chicago
Republican National Conventions
1912 in Illinois
1912 conferences
June 1912 events